Diogo Miguel Caramelo Santos (born 22 November 1992), known as Caramelo, is a Portuguese professional footballer who plays for União Desportiva Alta de Lisboa as a striker.

Club career
Born in Lisbon, Caramelo played youth football with S.L. Benfica He made his debut as senior in the lower leagues, successively representing G.D. Ribeirão and Real SC. 

Caramelo signed for Singapore club Tampines Rovers FC in June 2013 after a short trial, being joined in the adventure by countrymen Vítor Ladeiras and André Martins. He scored his first goal in the S.League on 25 August, helping to a 6–2 away win against Brunei DPMM FC.

Caramelo subsequently returned to his country, resuming his career in the third division or lower.

References

External links

1992 births
Living people
Footballers from Lisbon
Portuguese footballers
Association football forwards
Segunda Divisão players
S.L. Benfica footballers
G.D. Ribeirão players
Real S.C. players
C.D. Cova da Piedade players
F.C. Barreirense players
GS Loures players
G.D. Fabril players
Atlético Clube de Portugal players
Singapore Premier League players
Tampines Rovers FC players
Portuguese expatriate footballers
Expatriate footballers in Singapore
Portuguese expatriate sportspeople in Singapore